Keles is a satellite town, located 2 kilometers north-northwest from Tashkent, Uzbekistan. It is the administrative center of Tashkent District (tuman) of Tashkent Region (viloyat). Its population is 30,600 (2016). The river Keles, a tributary of the Syr Darya, flows north of the town.

References

Populated places in Tashkent Region
Cities in Uzbekistan